Thomas S. "Tom" McIntosh (February 6, 1927  - July 26, 2017) was an American jazz trombonist, composer, arranger, and conductor.

McIntosh was born in Baltimore, Maryland, the eldest of six siblings. He also had an elder half-sibling by his father. He studied at Peabody Conservatory. He was stationed in West Germany after World War II. He played trombone in an Army band, and eventually graduated from Juilliard in 1958. He played in New York City from 1956, with Lee Morgan, Roland Kirk, James Moody (1959, 1962) and the Art Farmer/Benny Golson Jazztet (1960–61).

In 1961, McIntosh composed a song for trumpeter Howard McGhee. In 1963, he composed music for Dizzy Gillespie's Something Old, Something New album. The following year his composition Whose Child Are You? was performed by the New York Jazz Sextet, of which he was a member. He also worked with Thad Jones and Mel Lewis later in the 1960s.

In 1969, McIntosh gave up jazz and moved to Los Angeles to pursue a career in film and television composing. He wrote music for The Learning Tree, Soul Soldier, Shaft's Big Score, Slither, A Hero Ain't Nothin' but a Sandwich, and John Handy.

In 2008, McIntosh was named a Jazz Master by the National Endowment for the Arts  McIntosh was baptized a Jehovah's Witness on August 13, 1960.

Discography 
Manhattan Serenade (1968) - Earl Coleman - with Jerome Richardson (fl) Billy Taylor (p) Frank Foster (ts) Tom McIntosh Eddie Williams (ts) Gene Bertoncini (g) Reggie Workman (b) Bobby Thomas (d)
With Malice Toward None: The Music Of Tom McIntosh (IPO, 2003)

As arranger/composer
With Art Blakey
Hold On, I'm Coming (Limelight, 1965)
With Illinois Jacquet
Bosses of the Ballad (Argo, 1964)
With James Moody
Another Bag (Argo, 1962)
Great Day (Argo, 1963)
Moody and the Brass Figures (Milestone, 1966)
The Blues and Other Colors (Miilestone, 1969)
With Bobby Timmons
Got to Get It! (Milestone, 1967)
With Milt Jackson
Milt Jackson and the Hip String Quartet (Verve, 1968)

As sideman
With Art Farmer
Big City Sounds (Argo, 1960) - with Benny Golson
The Jazztet and John Lewis (Argo, 1961) - with Benny Golson
The Jazztet at Birdhouse (Argo, 1961) - with Benny Golson
New York Jazz Sextet: Group Therapy (Scepter, 1966)
With Dizzy Gillespie
The Dizzy Gillespie Reunion Big Band (MPS, 1968)
With Eddie Harris
Plug Me In (Atlantic, 1968)
With Jimmy Heath
Really Big! (Riverside, 1960)
With Milt Jackson
Vibrations (Atlantic, 1960–61)
Big Bags (Riverside, 1962)
For Someone I Love (Riverside, 1963)
Ray Brown / Milt Jackson with Ray Brown (Verve, 1965)
With John Lewis
Odds Against Tomorrow (Soundtrack) (United Artists, 1959)
With Jack McDuff
Prelude (Prestige, 1963)
With James Moody
James Moody (Argo, 1959)
With Oliver Nelson
The Spirit of '67 with Pee Wee Russell (Impulse!, 1967)
With Shirley Scott
For Members Only (Impulse!, 1963)
Roll 'Em: Shirley Scott Plays the Big Bands (Impulse!, 1966)
With Jimmy Smith
Hoochie Coochie Man (Verve, 1966)

References

Sources
 Leonard Feather and Ira Gitler, The Biographical Encyclopedia of Jazz. Oxford, 1999, p. 451.

External links 
 McIntosh biodata, arts.gov. Accessed November 30, 2022. 
Conversations with NEA Jazz Masters, arts.endow.gov. Accessed November 30, 2022.
  

American jazz composers
American male jazz composers
American jazz trombonists
Male trombonists
1927 births
2017 deaths
Jazz musicians from Maryland
The Jazztet members
Juilliard School alumni
Peabody Institute alumni
American Jehovah's Witnesses
Place of death missing